Map of places in Perth and Kinross compiled from this list

This list of places in Perth and Kinross is a list of links for any town, village, hamlet, castle, golf course, historic house, nature reserve, reservoir, river, canal, and other place of interest in the Perth and Kinross council area of Scotland.

A
Abbots Deuglie
Aberfeldy, Aberfeldy Distillery
Abernethy
Acharn
Almondbank
Alyth
Amulree
Atholl, Atholl Highlanders
Auchterarder

B
Balado
Ballinluig
Bankfoot
Ben Lawers
Blackford
Black Hill Roman Camps
Blair Atholl, Blair Atholl Mill
Blair Castle
Blairgowrie
Bridgend
Bridge of Balgie
Bridge of Earn
Burrelton

C
Cairngorms National Park
Castle Menzies
Clunie
Cluny House
Comrie
Coupar Angus
Creag Odhar
Crieff

D
Drummond Castle
Dull
Dunkeld
Dunning

E
Errol

F
Fearnan
Finegand
Forgandenny
Forest of Atholl
Forteviot
Fortingall, Fortingall Yew
Fowlis Wester

G
Glen Lyon
Glenfarg
Glenshee, Glenshee Ski Centre
Gowrie
Grampian Mountains
Grandtully
Greenloaning

I
Inchture
Innerpeffray
Invergowrie

K
Keltybridge
Kenmore
Killiecrankie
Kindrogan
Kingoodie
Kinloch Rannoch
Kinross
Kinrossie
Kirkmichael

L
Lawers
Leetown
Loch Earn
Loch Lomond and The Trossachs National Park
Loch Rannoch
Loch Tay
Logierait
Luncarty

M
Madderty
McDiarmid Park
Meigle
Meikleour
Melville Monument
Methven
Milnathort
Muthill

O
Ochil Hills

P
Perth
Pitkeathly Wells
Pitlochry
Pitmiddle

R
Rannoch Moor
Rattray
River Ericht
River Isla
River Tay

S
Scone
Spittal of Glenshee
St Fillans
Stormontfield
Strathearn
Strathtay

T
Trinafour

W
Waterloo
Weem

See also
List of places in Scotland

Lists of places in Scotland
Populated places in Scotland